Steve Sutherland (born September 1, 1946) is a Canadian retired professional ice hockey winger who played 379 games in the World Hockey Association. He was a member of the Quebec Nordiques, Los Angeles Sharks, and Michigan Stags.

External links

References 

1946 births
Anglophone Quebec people
Canadian ice hockey left wingers
Sportspeople from Rouyn-Noranda
Living people
Los Angeles Sharks players
Michigan Stags players
Quebec Nordiques (WHA) players
Ice hockey people from Quebec